I'm Here may refer to:

 I'm Here (film), a 2010 film
 "I'm Here" (Charlie Major song)
 "I'm Here" (Yuna Ito song)
 "I'm Here", a song by Aly & AJ from Insomniatic
 "I'm Here", a song from The Color Purple (musical)
 "I'm Here", a song by Dolly Parton from I Believe in You
 "I'm Here", a song by Janet Jackson from Damita Jo
 I'm Here, an EP and its title song by The R.O.C. (rapper)

See also
 I Am Here (disambiguation)